The 1964 Major League Baseball season was played from April 13 to October 15, 1964. This season is often remembered for the end of the New York Yankees' third dynasty, as they won their 29th American League Championship in 44 seasons. However, the Yankees lost the World Series to the St. Louis Cardinals in seven games. As of 2022, the Cardinals are the only National League team to have an edge over the Yankees in series played (3–2), amongst the non-expansion teams.

Awards and honors
Baseball Hall of Fame
Luke Appling
Red Faber
Burleigh Grimes
Miller Huggins
Tim Keefe
Heinie Manush
John Ward
Most Valuable Player
Brooks Robinson, Baltimore Orioles, 3B (AL)
Ken Boyer, St. Louis Cardinals, 3B (NL)
Cy Young Award
Dean Chance, Los Angeles Angels
Rookie of the Year
Tony Oliva, Minnesota Twins, OF (AL)
Dick Allen, Philadelphia Phillies, 3B (NL)

Standings

American League

National League

Postseason

Bracket

MLB statistical leaders

Managers

American League

National League

Home Field Attendance

Events

January–April
February 2 – Red Faber, Burleigh Grimes, Tim Keefe, Heinie Manush, John Montgomery Ward, and Miller Huggins are elected to the Hall of Fame by the Special Veterans Committee.
February 17 – Former Chicago White Sox shortstop Luke Appling is selected to the Hall of Fame by the Baseball Writers' Association of America in a runoff vote. In 1953, the first year of eligibility for Appling, he received just two votes.
April 8 – Houston Colt .45s relief pitcher Jim Umbricht dies of cancer at the age of 33. The franchise would retire his number in 1965, by which time it is known as the Astros.
April 10 - The Polo Grounds was demolished by the same wrecking ball that was used to demolish Ebbets Field four years earlier.
April 17 – The New York Mets play their first game at brand-new Shea Stadium and lose 4–3 to the Pittsburgh Pirates. Willie Stargell hits the first home run in the stadium's history, a second-inning solo shot off the Mets' Jack Fisher. In the first-ever "Kiner's Korner" from Shea, Ralph Kiner's guest is Casey Stengel.
April 23 – At Colt Stadium, Ken Johnson of the Houston Colt .45's no-hits the Cincinnati Reds, and loses 1–0. Two ninth-inning errors allow the Reds to score the game's lone run: a two-base throwing error by Johnson himself on Pete Rose's ground ball, and the second by Nellie Fox on Vada Pinson's grounder, which scores Rose. To date, the game is the only one in Major League history whose losing pitcher had pitched a nine-inning no-hitter.
August 27 – The New York Mets sign Jerry Koosman as an amateur free agent.

May–August

May 31 – The second game of a double header at Shea Stadium between the San Francisco Giants and New York Mets lasts 23 innings. The Giants eventually win it, 8–6.
June 4 – Sandy Koufax pitches the third of his four career no hitters, defeating the Phillies 3–0 at Connie Mack Stadium in Philadelphia.
June 15 – The Chicago Cubs trade Lou Brock, Jack Spring and Paul Toth to the St. Louis Cardinals for Ernie Broglio, Doug Clemens and Bobby Shantz. The swap eventually gains notoriety as perhaps the most lopsided in the history of baseball, as Brock goes on to a Hall of Fame career in St. Louis while Broglio posts a 7–19 record in a Cubs uniform.
June 21 – On Father's Day at Shea Stadium, Jim Bunning fans ten, drives in two runs, and pitches the first perfect game (excluding Don Larsen's 1956 World Series effort, and Harvey Haddix's 1959 extra-innings loss) since Charlie Robertson's on April 30, 1922, as the Philadelphia Phillies beat the New York Mets 6–0. Bunning also becomes the first pitcher to throw no-hitters in both leagues, and Gus Triandos becomes the first catcher to catch a no-hitter in each league. Bunning throws just 90 pitches in winning his second no-hitter. The next time Bunning faces the Mets he will shut them out, the first no-hit pitcher in the 20th century to do that. The Mets fare little better in the nightcap, as 18-year-old rookie Rick Wise pitches into the seventh inning to win his first game, giving up just three hits and three walks (Johnny Klippstein pitched the final three innings). The Phillies increase their National League lead to two games over the San Francisco Giants.
July 7 – At Shea Stadium, Johnny Callison's ninth-inning three-run home run off Dick Radatz caps a four-run rally and gives the National League a 7–4 win over the American League in the All-Star Game. Callison is named Game MVP as the NL triumph evens the series at 17.
July 19 – Luis Tiant pitches a complete-game, four-hit shutout in his Major League debut, leading the Cleveland Indians to a 3–0 victory over Whitey Ford and the New York Yankees at Yankee Stadium. Tiant allowed just four singles while striking out eleven.
July 23 – Bert Campaneris of the Kansas City Athletics became the second player in Major League history to hit two home runs in his Major League debut, joining Bob Nieman, who did it in the 1951 season. Mark Quinn will join the select group in 1999.
August 12 – Mickey Mantle hits a home run from both sides of the plate in a 7–3 Yankees win over the Chicago White Sox. It is the tenth time in his career that he has done so and a major league record for switch-hit homers in a game.
August 20 – At Comiskey Park, the Chicago White Sox complete a four-game sweep of the New York Yankees with a 5–0 shutout. As the Yankees' team bus heads to O'Hare International Airport after the game, infielder Phil Linz takes out a harmonica and plays a plaintive version of "Mary Had a Little Lamb." Manager Yogi Berra tells Linz to put the harmonica away. When asked what Berra had said, Mickey Mantle tells Linz to "play it louder." Linz does so, prompting an unusually angry Berra to storm to the back to the bus and slap the harmonica out of Linz' hands; the instrument strikes Joe Pepitone's knee. The "Harmonica Incident" convinces the Yankee front office that Berra has lost control of the team and cannot command respect from his players. As a result, the decision is made to fire Berra at the end of the season.
August 31 – Ground breaking is held for the new Anaheim Stadium.

September–December
September 9 – The St. Louis Cardinals and Philadelphia Phillies go into extra innings at Connie Mack Stadium tied at five. An error by Dick Allen leads to three unearned runs as the Cards score five in the eleventh for a 10–5 victory.
September 12 – Frank Bertaina of the Baltimore Orioles beats Bob Meyer of the Kansas City Athletics, 1–0, in a game in which both pitchers throw a one-hitter. The Orioles also set a Major League record for the fewest at bats by one team in a game, with 19 in eight innings.
September 20 – Jim Bunning strikes out Johnny Roseboro in the ninth inning to preserve the Philadelphia Phillies' 3–2 win over the Los Angeles Dodgers in Los Angeles. The win comes after two straight losses (both charged to Jack Baldschun) and leaves the first place Phils in front of the National League by 6½ games with 12 games to play. When they return to Philadelphia in the early morning, 2,000 fans, including mayor James Tate are on hand to greet the team.
September 21 – John Tsitouris hurls a 1–0 shutout for the Cincinnati Reds over Art Mahaffey and the first-place Phillies, launching a 10-game Phillies losing streak. Rookie Chico Ruiz scores the only run when, with Frank Robinson at bat, he steals home with two outs in the sixth inning.
September 27 – Johnny Callison hits three home runs, but the Phillies lose to the Milwaukee Braves 14–8. The Phils suffer the seventh loss in their 10-game losing streak, while the Reds sweep the New York Mets (4–1 and 3–1). These results knock Philadelphia out of first place, with the Reds replacing them atop the NL standings. The Phillies would never return to first place in 1964.
September 29 – The Pittsburgh Pirates blank the Reds 2–0 at Crosley Field (despite the Reds getting 11 hits off Bob Friend) to end the Reds' nine-game winning streak. Meanwhile, the St. Louis Cardinals defeat the Phillies 4–2 at Busch Stadium, the seventh win in the Cardinals' eight-game winning streak and the ninth loss in the Phillies' 10-game losing streak. The win, Ray Sadecki's 20th of the season, puts the Cardinals into a tie for first place with the Reds; St. Louis had been 11 games out of first on August 23.
October 3 – The New York Yankees clinch their 14th American League pennant in 16 years with an 8–3 victory over the Cleveland Indians, holding off the Chicago White Sox by a single game.
October 3 – As a result of the now-concluded Phillies' 10-game losing streak, this day begins with four teams still having a mathematical shot at the NL pennant. One of them, the San Francisco Giants, is eliminated with a 10–7 loss to the Chicago Cubs.  At the end of the day's play, the Reds and the Cardinals are tied for first place, with the Phillies a game back. In recent days, the NL has had to scramble to schedule various possible playoffs.
October 4 – The Phillies defeat the Reds, 10–0, in the last regular-season game for both teams unless there is a playoff; that result clinches (for the Cardinals) a tie for the NL pennant. At the end of that game, both teams are ½ game back of the Cardinals, and await the result of the Cardinals-Mets game.  Then, the Cardinals, never in first place until the last week of the season, clinch their first pennant since 1946 with an 11–5 win over the Mets, who had just beaten the Cardinals twice in the two preceding days. The win by the Cardinals averts a three-way tie for the NL pennant, with the Phillies and the Reds both finishing one game back in a second-place tie.
October 15 – The St. Louis Cardinals take an early lead in the deciding World Series Game Seven over the New York Yankees. Lou Brock hits a fifth-inning home run to give pitcher Bob Gibson a 6–0 lead. Mickey Mantle, Clete Boyer and Phil Linz homer for New York, but the Yankees fall short. The Cardinals win the game 7–5 and are the World Champions. The Boyer brothers, Ken for St. Louis and Clete for the Yankees, homer in their last World Series appearance, a first in major league history.
October 16 – The day after the final game of the World Series, the managerial posts of both pennant winning teams are vacant. In the morning, Johnny Keane, manager of the victorious St. Louis Cardinals, resigns, much to the surprise of owner Gussie Busch. Hours later, New York Yankee general manager Ralph Houk fires Yogi Berra as his manager, citing Berra's lack of control over team and his inability to command respect from his players. Less than a week later, Houk replaces Berra with Keane; meanwhile, Berra reunites with Casey Stengel as a coach with the New York Mets.
November 2 – CBS Broadcasting Inc. becomes the first corporate owner of a Major League team after buying eighty percent of the New York Yankees assets for $11,200,000.
November 10 – The Braves sign a 25-year lease to play in the new Atlanta–Fulton County Stadium.
November 24 – St. Louis Cardinals third baseman Ken Boyer, who hit .295 with 24 home runs and 119 RBI, is named National League Most Valuable Player with 243 points. The Phillies' Johnny Callison (187) and Boyer's Cardinal teammate Bill White are the runners-up.
December 1 – The Houston Colt .45s officially change their nickname to Astros. The change coincides with the team's impending move from Colt Stadium to the Harris County Domed Stadium, also known as the Astrodome. A change in name for the three-year-old franchise is necessitated due to a dispute with the Colt firearm company; the Astros name is chosen due to Houston being the home of NASA's Manned Spacecraft Center (later the Lyndon B. Johnson Space Center).
December 4:
The Minnesota Twins acquire extremely versatile utility César Tovar from the Cincinnati Reds in exchange for pitcher Gerry Arrigo. Tovar will play eight seasons in Minnesota.
MLB owners decide to use a free agent draft beginning in January 1965. The inverse order of the previous year's standings will be used to select players every four months.

See also
1964 Nippon Professional Baseball season

References

External links
1964 Major League Baseball season schedule

 
Major League Baseball seasons